David Boyd Limbrick is an Australian politician. He is a Liberal Democratic Party member of the Victorian Legislative Council from 2018, representing South Eastern Metropolitan Region. He resigned in April 2022 to contest the 2022 federal election as a Senate candidate for his party. In June 2022 he returned to the Victorian Parliament as an MP.

Political career 
In 2018, Limbrick stood as a candidate for the Liberal Democratic Party for the South Eastern Metropolitan Region in the Victorian Parliament. He was elected to the seat with 0.84% of first preference votes. 

On 25 November 2021, Limbrick announced his intention to run at the 2022 federal election in the Senate. He resigned from the Legislative Council on 11 April 2022.

On 22 June 2022, Limbrick, after failing to gain a seat in the 2022 federal election, was reappointed to the Legislative Council as the Member for South Eastern Metropolitan Region, in a joint sitting of the Victorian Parliament to fill the vacancy caused by his resignation. He ran for the 2022 Victorian state Election being re-elected for member of the South-Eastern Metro region

References

Year of birth missing (living people)
Living people
Liberal Democratic Party members of the Parliament of Victoria
Members of the Victorian Legislative Council
21st-century Australian politicians